Ras-related protein Rab-34 is a protein that in humans is encoded by the RAB34 gene.

References

Further reading